Tortinshi Bilik (Tórtinshi Bılik; literally: Fourth Estate) is a Kazakh newspaper. Along with DAT and the magazine Altyn Tamyr, it is an opposition news source.

References

See also
Media of Kazakhstan

Kazakh-language newspapers
Newspapers published in Kazakhstan